Rasmus Horn Langhoff (born 8 October 1980 in Slagelse) is a Danish politician, who is a member of the Folketing for the Social Democrats political party. He was elected into parliament in the 2011 Danish general election.

Political career
Langhoff was first elected into parliament in the 2011 election, where he received 5,410 personal votes. He was reelected in 2015 with 5,917 votes and in 2019 with 5,812 votes.

References

External links 
 Biography on the website of the Danish Parliament (Folketinget)

Living people
1980 births
People from Slagelse
Social Democrats (Denmark) politicians
Members of the Folketing 2011–2015
Members of the Folketing 2015–2019
Members of the Folketing 2019–2022
Members of the Folketing 2022–2026